Mazidabad may refer to:
 Mazidabad, Zanjan